Arthit Kansangwet (born July 22, 1998) is a Thai professional footballer who plays as a right-back.

Honours

International
Thailand U-19
 AFF U-19 Youth Championship: 2015

References

External links
Thailand - A. Kansangwet - Profile with news, career statistics and history - Soccerway at Soccerway

1998 births
Living people
Arthit Kansangwet
Arthit Kansangwet
Association football fullbacks
Arthit Kansangwet
Arthit Kansangwet